St Nicholas of Myra is a Grade I listed parish church in South Ockendon, Essex, England, 20 miles east of London and 8 miles south-east of Romford. The building has been under the National Heritage List for England since February 8, 1960. It stands on the south side of the green in the middle of the village as it has done for 860 years.

Dedication 
The church is dedicated to St Nicholas, Bishop of Myra (now Demre in modern Turkey) in the 4th century; a signatory of the Nicene Creed; patron saint of Russia and Greece, and of children, merchants, pawnbrokers, sailors, scholars and travellers.

Ministry 
St Nicholas is part of the Mardyke Team Ministry.

Construction 
The walls are of flint and stone rubble; the dressings are of Reigate Stone. Although the two top storeys are 19th century, the four storied round tower was built onto the existing 12th century structure in the mid 13th century. Almost all of the church was rebuilt late in the 15th century when the north aisle and chapel were added and a 12th-century doorway was reset in the north wall of the aisle. In 1744 the western part of the tower collapsed and was rebuilt. The chancel and north chapel, were extensively restored in 1866.

The Round Tower 
St Nicholas is one of only six Essex Round Tower Churches.  In 1552 the tower contained four bells but they were destroyed by lightning which struck the church and demolished the tower's thatched spire in 1652/3. Richard Mulford, the Sexton donated a bell to replace the four bells, this bell was cast by John and Christopher Hodson of London in 1678. The present bell was installed in 1865, donated by Richard Armstrong of Westbourne Park Villas, London and cast by the famous Whitechapel Bell Foundry in London.

The Porch & North Doorway 
The 12th-century north doorway was moved out and reset in its present position in the 15th century, surrounded by a 19th-century porch. The Norman doorway has three orders and the middle columns have spiral fluting and shaft ring enrichments. The capitals are carved with volutes and foliage; the arches are also decorated lavishly with chevrons and billets.

The Lady Chapel and Saltonstall Memorial 
Interred in this chapel is Sir Richard Saltonstall (1521–1601), Lord of the Manor, patron of the church and Lord Mayor of London in 1597. There is a fine Elizabethan monument to Sir Richard erected by his wife Susannah, located on the north wall of the chapel. The monument is built of variegated marble. Between the columns are two arches forming alcoves for the principal figures of Sir Richard and his wife. Sir Richard can be seen wearing the insignia of the Lord Mayor of London. In the plinth are the figures of their sixteen children.

External links 

 St. Nicholas Church at roundtowers.org

References

Church of England church buildings in Thurrock
South Ockendon
Grade I listed churches in Essex
Catholic church buildings in the United Kingdom
Round towers